The following tables compare general and technical information for a number of file systems.

General information

Limits 

While storage devices usually have their size expressed in powers of 10 (for instance a 1 TB Solid State Drive will contain at least 1,000,000,000,000 (1012, 10004) bytes), filesystem limits are invariably powers of 2, so usually expressed with IEC prefixes. For instance, a 1 TiB limit means 240, 10244 bytes. Approximations (rounding down) using power of 10 are also given below to remove confusions.

Metadata

Features

File capabilities

Block capabilities
Note that in addition to the below table, block capabilities can be implemented below the file system layer in Linux (LVM, integritysetup, cryptsetup) or Windows (Volume Shadow Copy Service, SECURITY), etc.

Resize capabilities
"online" and "offline" are synonymous with "mounted" and "not mounted".

Allocation and layout policies

OS support

See also 
 List of file systems
 Comparison of file archivers
 List of archive formats
 Comparison of archive formats

Notes

References

External links 
 A speed comparison of filesystems on Linux 2.4.5 (archived)
 Filesystems (ext3, reiser, xfs, jfs) comparison on Debian Etch  (April 23, 2006)
 Block allocation strategies of various filesystems
 What are the (dis)advantages of ext4, ReiserFS, JFS, and XFS? - Unix & Linux Stack Exchange

 
File systems